Casasia jacquinioides is a species of plant belonging to the family Rubiaceae.

References

jacquinioides